The politics of Rhineland-Palatinate takes place within a framework of a federal parliamentary representative democratic republic, where the Federal Government of Germany exercises sovereign rights with certain powers reserved to the states of Germany including Rhineland-Palatinate. The state has a multi-party system where the two main parties are the center-right Christian Democratic Union (CDU) and the center-left Social Democratic Party of Germany (SPD).

Every five years, all Germans residing in the State over the age of 18 elect the members of the Rhineland-Palatinate Landtag. This regional parliament or legislature then elects the Minister-President and confirms the cabinet members. Rhineland-Palatinate is the only German Bundesland to have a cabinet minister for winegrowing (ministry of economy, traffic, agriculture and winegrowing)

List of Minister-presidents of Rhineland-Palatinate

June 13, 1947 - July 9, 1947: Wilhelm Boden, CDU
1947 - 1969: Peter Altmeier, CDU
1969 - 1976: Helmut Kohl, CDU
1976 - 1988: Bernhard Vogel, CDU
1988 - 1991: Carl-Ludwig Wagner, CDU
1991 - 1994: Rudolf Scharping, SPD
1994 - 2013: Kurt Beck, SPD
2013 - incumbent Malu Dreyer, SPD

Latest election 

In the election, the SPD suffered large loss, falling by 10% of the vote and winning only one seat more than the Christian Democratic Union.  The main winners were Alliance '90/The Greens, who surged to over 15% of the vote, having failed to even break through the 5% threshold in 2006.  In 2011, however, the Free Democratic Party failed to break through 5%, and thus lost the 10 seats they'd won in 2006.